Józsefváros is the 8th district of Budapest, Hungary. It is the part of the city centre in the wider sense as one of the 18–19th century older suburbs, close to Belváros.

Location

The main streets in Józsefváros are Baross utca, Rákóczi út and Üllői út; Kálvin tér connects this district with the 5th and 9th. Keleti (Eastern) Railway Station is located at the junction of 7th, 8th and 14th districts.

Name

The 18th century suburb was first called Alsó-Külváros (literally "Lower Suburb"). It was named after the heir of the Hungarian throne, Emperor Joseph II in 1777.

Description

Józsefváros mostly consists of old, often neglected residential buildings with nice interiors. It can be divided into three parts, the borders being Grand Boulevard (Nagykörút) and the roads Fiumei út and Orczy út.

The innermost, central part includes several remarkable spots, such as the National Museum, and the central buildings of the Eötvös Loránd University, the Semmelweis University, the Academy of Drama and Film, and the Metropolitan Ervin Szabó Library, complemented by the Kempelen Farkas Student Information and Resource Centre. The Piarist Secondary School, the main building of the Károli Gáspár University of the Reformed Church, and the Law Faculty of the Pázmány Péter Catholic University are also situated here, as well as the Hungarian Radio. This part is called "Palace Quarter", out of which one can still see Wenckheim Palace, hosting the Metropolitan Library, and Pálffy Palace with the Classical Music Collection of the above. This neighborhood underwent major renovations between 1996 and 2002 and it has become a happy, swarming place with scores of students and several cafés and pizzerias.

The second part, beyond Nagykörút (about  farther) has a worse reputation, due to the prostitution that was rampant in the 1990s (and earlier), which has been mostly eliminated through cameras throughout the district. In this part one can find the Centre for Foreign Languages (the oldest and "authentic" language examination place in Hungary), Erkel Theatre (a department of the Hungarian State Opera House), the Hungarian Natural History Museum, Corvin Budapest Film Palace (a multiplex cinema), one of Budapest's biggest gardens (Orczy-kert), and a large complex of cliniques.

Its traditional craftsmen neighbourhood, which became a slum in the previous decades, is currently under re-development. The dilapidated 19th century housing stock is cleared to make way for large office blocks and housing developments. Corvin-Szigony Project is the biggest urban renewal project in Central-Europe. The effects and methods of the project were criticized, mainly for the destruction of the architectural heritage of the area.

The residential parts occupy less area in the third part, which is noted for Eastern Railway Station, Józsefváros Railway Station and Kerepesi Cemetery, one of the most famous cemeteries in Hungary, with mausoleums for the most reputable historical personalities.

Neighborhoods and metro

Demographics

According to 2011 census, the population of the district was 76,250. It is relatively homogeneous with the Hungarian majority. Józsefváros is noted for its high concentrations of Roma (Gipsy) residents (4.5%). The district has attracted a significant number of Chinese immigrants (0.8%).

Politics 
The current mayor of VIII. District of Budapest is András Pikó (member of c8 - NGO in VIII district - supported by Momentum).

The District Assembly, elected at the 2019 local government elections, is made up of 18 members (1 Mayor, 12 Individual constituencies MEPs and 5 Compensation List MEPs) divided into this political parties and alliances:

List of mayors

Related novels and movies

Ferenc Molnár's youth novel, The Paul Street Boys (A Pál utcai fiúk, 1907), which was made into film several times (see the Imdb entry of the most famous version), originally takes place at real venues of this district: Pál utca, Mária utca and Füvészkert (botanical garden).

In 2004, a caricaturistic animated movie Nyócker was made about an infamous part of this district which has been screened in several European countries and won numerous awards on the international scene.

The starting and closing scenes of Fateless (Sorstalanság, 2005), the movie made from Imre Kertész's Nobel Prize–winning novel, were screened in this district, namely at Lőrinc pap tér.

The second season of Baptiste, a British TV Drama, takes place around Jozsefvaros, and hate crimes against the immigrant population that lives there.

Twin towns
Józsefváros is twinned with:
   Pescina, L'Aquila, Italy
   District VIII of Vienna, Austria
  Iosefin of Timișoara, Romania
  Küçükçekmece of Istanbul, Turkey
  Aalborg, Denmark

See also
Auróra, community centre in the district
Palotanegyed, a neighborhood in the district.
List of districts in Budapest

Gallery

Notes and references

External links 

 Budapest Sun article
 Aerial photographs of Józsefváros

 
Romani communities in Hungary